Simply the Truth is an album by blues musician John Lee Hooker released by the BluesWay label in 1969.

Reception

AllMusic reviewer Richie Unterberger stated: "Overseen by noted jazz producer Bob Thiele, this session had Hooker backed by some of his fullest arrangements to date ... The slightly modernized sound was ultimately neither here nor there, the center remaining Hooker's voice and lyrics. ... Another of his many characteristically solid efforts, although it's not one of his more interesting albums".

Track listing
All compositions credited to John Lee Hooker
 "I Don't Wanna Go to Vietnam" – 5:36
 "Mini Skirts" – 3:28
 "Mean Mean Woman" – 5:45
 "I Wanna Bugaloo" – 4:15
 "Tantalizing with the Blue" – 5:05
 "(Twist Ain't Nothin') But the Old Time Shimmy" – 3:19
 "One Room Country Shack" – 4:27
 "I'm Just a Drifter" – 6:04

Personnel
John Lee Hooker – guitar, vocals
Hele Rosenthal – harmonica
Ernie Hayes – piano, organ
Wally Richardson – guitar
William Folwell – bass
Bernard Purdie – drums

References

John Lee Hooker albums
1969 albums
BluesWay Records albums
Albums produced by Bob Thiele